Caney Ridge is an unincorporated community and census-designated place (CDP) in Cherokee County, Oklahoma, United States, within the Cherokee Nation. It was first listed as a CDP prior to the 2020 census.

The CDP is in southeastern Cherokee County, on a ridge between two arms of Tenkiller Ferry Lake: Caney Creek to the north and Dry Creek to the south. The CDP is bordered to the north by Tenkiller, to the east by Barber, and to the south by Dry Creek. The western tip of the CDP touches the Illinois River in Tenkiller Ferry Lake.

Oklahoma State Highway 100 passes through Caney Ridge, leading east  to Stilwell and southwest  to its end at State Highway 82, which leads northwest  to Tahlequah, the Cherokee county seat.

Demographics

References 

Census-designated places in Cherokee County, Oklahoma
Census-designated places in Oklahoma